George Johnson (born December 11, 1987) is a former American football defensive end. He was originally signed by the Tampa Bay Buccaneers as an undrafted free agent in 2010. He played college football at Rutgers. He has also played for the Minnesota Vikings, Detroit Lions, and New Orleans Saints.

Johnson grew up in Glassboro, New Jersey and starred at Glassboro High School, where he returns annually to run a football camp.

Professional career

Tampa Bay Buccaneers
Johnson was signed by the Tampa Bay Buccaneers as an undrafted free agent on May 3, 2010. The Buccaneers released him on August 10, 2010 but signed him two weeks later. On September 5, 2010, Tampa Bay signed him to their practice squad. He was promoted to the active roster on December 14, but did not play in a game that season.

Minnesota Vikings
On November 9, 2012, Johnson was signed to the Minnesota Vikings' practice squad. He was promoted to the active roster on December 22, 2012. He was released on October 9, 2013.

Detroit Lions
On April 21, 2014, Johnson was signed by the Detroit Lions. In the first game of the 2014 season against the New York Giants, he recorded 1.5 sacks.

Set to be a restricted free agent in 2015, the Lions tendered a one-year contract to Johnson. On April 7, 2015, the Tampa Bay Buccaneers extended a three-year offer sheet to Johnson. The Lions then disputed the sheet on April 13, 2015, sending it to arbitration.

Second stint with Buccaneers
On April 15, 2015, the Lions then traded Johnson and a seventh-round pick to the Buccaneers in exchange for a fifth-round pick. He played in 15 games with 5 starts his first year in Tampa, recording 23 tackles and two forced fumbles.

On August 5, 2016, Johnson was placed on season-ending injured reserve with a hip injury.

On September 1, 2017, Johnson was released by the Buccaneers.

Second stint with the Lions
On September 20, 2017, Johnson was signed by the Lions. He was released on October 18, 2017. He was re-signed again on November 14, but was released the next day.

New Orleans Saints
On December 12, 2017, Johnson signed with the New Orleans Saints. In his first game with New Orleans against the New York Jets, he recorded a sack. In the following contest against the Atlanta Falcons, he was credited with another 1.5 sacks.

On March 7, 2018, Johnson signed a one-year contract extension with the Saints for $1.005 million. He was released on September 1, 2018.

New York Guardians
In October 2019, Johnson was selected by the New York Guardians in the open phase of the 2020 XFL Draft. He was released during mini-camp in December 2019.

References

External links
 Tampa Bay Buccaneers bio
 Detroit Lions bio

1989 births
Living people
Players of American football from New Jersey
Glassboro High School alumni
People from Glassboro, New Jersey
Sportspeople from Gloucester County, New Jersey
American football defensive ends
African-American players of American football
Rutgers Scarlet Knights football players
Tampa Bay Buccaneers players
Minnesota Vikings players
Detroit Lions players
New Orleans Saints players
New York Guardians players
21st-century African-American sportspeople
20th-century African-American people